Red Rock, Arizona may refer to:
Red Rock, Apache County, Arizona, an unincorporated community in Apache County
Red Rock, Pinal County, Arizona, an unincorporated community in Pinal County
Red Rock, Yavapai County, Arizona, an unincorporated community in Yavapai County